The Florida Marlins' 2008 season was the 16th season for the Major League Baseball franchise.  Fredi González returned for his second season as manager.  Despite having the lowest payroll in the Major Leagues, the Marlins finished with a record of 84–77, the 4th best record in franchise history, however, they failed to make the playoffs for the 5th consecutive season.

Offseason
 February 15, 2008:  Signed outfielder Marcell Ozuna as a non-drafted free agent.

Regular season

April
The season started off well for the Marlins even though they lost the opening series to the New York Mets. They go on to beat the Pittsburgh Pirates, sweep the Washington Nationals in their series, and take the first game of the series vs. Houston Astros while earning their 4th straight victory and leading their division with a 7–3 record by 1 ½ games the first week.
They tied the franchise record for the most victories in April, with 15.

May
The Marlins started the month with a loss to the Dodgers, but after taking two of three from the Padres they swept the Brewers and the Nationals back-to-back to eventually improve to a Major League best record on May 11, before the Reds took three in a row in Cincinnati. After a rainout the Royals handed the Marlins their fourth consecutive loss, the last two of the interleague series were split. They went on to sweep the Arizona Diamondbacks, whom at that time had the National League's best record, and in that process stopped Brandon Webb from starting the season with a 10–0 record, a feat not accomplished since World War I. After winning the homes series against the Giants and losing to the Mets at Shea Stadium the Marlins split the first two of three in Philadelphia to finish May atop their division with a half-game edge over the Phillies. They were in first place or tied for first all through the month except for May 30.

June
After a loss in Philadelphia, the Marlins fell back to second place in the division, but they could hold the second spot despite losing three of four in Atlanta. Back in Dolphin Stadium, they split a four-game series against the Reds. In the last game of the series on June 9,  hit his 600th career home run off Mark Hendrickson in a 9–4 loss. The Marlins finished their home stand winning two of three against the Phillies, and narrowed the gap to their division rival to three games. An interleague road swing starting in St. Petersburg saw both teams of the Citrus Series sporting records above .500 for the first time ever. Tampa Bay took the first two games, but an outstanding performance by Ricky Nolasco earned him the win and a shared NL Player of the Week award, and let the series finish on a high note for the Fish.  For the first time in Seattle at Safeco Field, they took two of three on solid outings by youngsters Andrew Miller and Ryan Tucker, before heading after a day off to another new ballpark for a three-game series against the Oakland Athletics. Despite a Marlins' long ball attack with four home runs in the first encounter, the A's won it in extra innings to take two of three. After a day off the Marlins were swept in three games by their state rival Tampa Bay Rays to finish 2008 interleague play with a 5–10 record. The first loss to the D-Backs in 2008 was the only blemish in the last four games in June. Throughout the month in second place they trailed the Phillies only half a game in the division standings on June 30.

July
The Marlins stayed in the top three of the NL East division throughout the month. They won or split all but two — against the Rockies and the Braves — of their series in July. Though they never held first place, they neither were back more than three games and finished the month seven games over .500, trailing the first place Phillies only by 1½ games. Remarkable was a game at Coors Field on July 4, where the Marlins were vanquished after blowing a nine run lead to finally lose 18–17. Ironically, the Marlins led the NL with 32 come-from-behind wins as of the end of the month. The rotation was shaken up with the call-up of Chris Volstad on July 6. He earned his first win that same night in two innings of relief at Colorado, then earning his first win as a starter five days later at the Dodgers with a brilliant 8⅔ inning performance, helping the Marlins take three of four in L.A. Right before the All-Star break, Josh Johnson made it back to the line-up, only eleven months after having undergone Tommy John surgery. On July 31, Aníbal Sánchez also had his comeback after shoulder surgery. Both of them boosted the rotation like the acquisition of top pitchers. Before the July 31 trade deadline, there were major rumors of the Fish acquiring Manny Ramírez for the rest of the season, but he eventually was traded to the Dodgers. The multiple rumors did not impact the squad, having beaten both the Cubs at Wrigley and their division rivals Mets at home twice, before taking the first game of a four-game series against the Rockies at Dolphin Stadium.

Hanley Ramírez was elected to start at shortstop for the NL in the All-Star Game, and finished 2-for-3 with a run scored. Fellow Marlin All-Star Dan Uggla competed in a memorable Home Run Derby, and became the first player with three errors in a single All-Star Game, a not so favorable distinction, along with three strikeouts in the longest MLB All-Star Game in history.

August
August became a rough month for the Marlins, and for the first time in the season, the team significantly lost ground in the divisional race to the Mets and the Phillies. While the Fish started the month only one and a half games back, they fell to seven games behind the then first place New York Mets on August 31. The offense struggled, as did the bullpen. The solid rotation with Josh Johnson, Chris Volstad and an outstanding Ricky Nolasco was not enough to carry the team with a lack of production at the plate. After blowing a few late leads, closer Kevin Gregg was limited in his appearances while allowing his tender knee to heal. Matt Lindstrom took over as closer. The only series wins came on the road at the Phillies and the Diamondbacks, but without any back-to-back wins in the entirety of August, the Marlins could not keep pace with the division leading teams. Highlights in August were the first complete games since September 16, 2006, thrown by Ricky Nolasco on August 19 against the Giants, and followed up by Johnson's complete game on August 27 against the Braves. Nolasco's complete game ended an MLB record set by the Marlins for most games between complete games.

September
The hopes of climbing back to first place in the National League East were low, but the Marlins kept battling in the month of September. In the process, they accomplished an MLB-first feat. With Jorge Cantú's 25th home run of the season, the Marlins' infielders became the first starting infielder foursome in MLB history to each hit 25 or more home runs. Additionally, Hanley Ramírez's decisive home run on September 13 made him the second Marlin ever to join the 30–30 club. During the month, the Marlins tied a franchise record of nine straight wins. This put them at 4 games back in the East division and 3.5 games back in the NL Wild Card race. That late surge wasn't enough though, as the Marlins lost the next four games. In the final season series, the Marlins played spoiler, ruining the Mets playoff chances by winning two of three in New York. The Marlins ended the season with an 84–77 record. This was their best non-playoff season record in franchise history, and third best season record overall.

Season standings

Record vs. opponents

Roster

Game log

|- align="center" bgcolor="ffbbbb"
| 1 || March 31 || Mets || 7–2 || Santana (1–0) || Hendrickson (0–1) || || 38,308 || 0–1
|-

|- align="center" bgcolor="bbffbb"
| 2 || April 1 || Mets || 5–4 || J. Miller (1–0) || Wise (0–1) || || 15,117 || 1–1
|- align="center" bgcolor="ffbbbb"
| 3 || April 2 || Mets || 13–0 || Pérez (1–0) || A. Miller (0–1) || || 13,720 || 1–2
|- align="center" bgcolor="bbffbb"
| 4 || April 4 || Pirates || 5–4 || Gregg (1–0) || Osoria (1–1) || || 10,089 || 2–2
|- align="center" bgcolor="bbffbb"
| 5 || April 5 || Pirates || 7–3 || Hendrickson (1–1) || Maholm (0–1) || || 15,752 || 3–2
|- align="center" bgcolor="ffbbbb"
| 6 || April 6 || Pirates || 9–2 || Snell (1–0)|| VandenHurk (0–1) || || 10,431 || 3–3
|- align="center" bgcolor="bbffbb"
| 7 || April 7 || @ Nationals ||10–7||Pinto (1–0) || Redding (1–1) ||Gregg (1) ||20,487 || 4–3
|- align="center" bgcolor="bbffbb"
| 8 || April 9 || @ Nationals ||10–4 ||Olsen (1–0)||Bergmann (0–1) || ||23,340 || 5–3
|- align="center" bgcolor="bbffbb"
| 9 || April 10 || @ Nationals ||4–3 ||Hendrickson (2–1) ||Pérez (0–2) ||Gregg (2) ||24,549 || 6–3
|- align="center" bgcolor="bbffbb"
| 10 || April 11 || @ Astros ||10–6 ||Nolasco (1–0) ||Oswalt (0–3) || ||34,191 || 7–3
|- align="center" bgcolor="ffbbbb"
| 11 || April 12 || @ Astros || 5–0 || Backe (1–1) || Badenhop (0–1) || || 34,336 || 7–4
|- align="center" bgcolor="ffbbbb"
| 12 || April 13 || @ Astros || 5–1 || Rodríguez (2–0) ||A. Miller (0–2) || || 29,766 || 7–5
|- align="center" bgcolor="bbffbb"
| 13 || April 15 || Braves || 4–0 || Olsen (2–0) || Jurrjens (1–2) || || 10,462 || 8–5
|- align="center" bgcolor="bbffbb"
| 14 || April 16 || Braves || 6–5 ||Hendrickson (3–1) || Hudson (2–1) ||Gregg (3) || 10,712 || 9–5
|- align="center" bgcolor="ffbbbb"
| 15 || April 17 || Braves || 8–0 || Smoltz (3–0) ||Nolasco (1–1) || || 11,237|| 9–6
|- align="center" bgcolor="ffbbbb"
| 16 || April 18 || Nationals || 6–4 || Redding (3–1) || J. Miller (1–1) ||  Rauch (3) || 13,279 || 9–7
|- align="center" bgcolor="bbffbb"
| 17 || April 19 || Nationals || 6–5 || Gregg (2–0) || Rivera (1–1) || || 18,944 || 10–7
|- align="center" bgcolor="bbffbb"
| 18 || April 20 || Nationals || 6–1 || Olsen (3–0) || Ayala (0–1) || || 11,635 || 11–7
|- align="center" bgcolor="bbffbb"
| 19 || April 21 || @ Pirates || 10–4||Hendrickson (4–1) || Morris (0–3)|| || 8,444|| 12–7
|- align="center" bgcolor="ffbbbb"
| 20 || April 22 || @ Pirates || 3–2||  Maholm (1–2)|| Nolasco (1–2) ||  Capps (5)|| 10,185|| 12–8
|- align="center" bgcolor="bbffbb"
| 21 || April 23 || @ Braves || 7–2|| A. Miller (1–2) ||  Bennett (0–1)|| || 19,852|| 13–8
|- align="center" bgcolor="ffbbbb"
| 22 || April 24 || @ Braves || 7–4||  James (2–1)||  Badenhop (0–2) ||  Acosta (2) || 19,903|| 13–9
|- align="center" bgcolor="bbffbb"
| 23 || April 25 || @ Brewers || 3–0|| Gregg (3–0) ||Mota (1–1) || || 40,088|| 14–9
|- align="center" bgcolor="ffbbbb"
| 24 || April 26 || @ Brewers || 4–3|| Torres (3–0)|| Pinto (1–1) || Gagné (7)|| 44,169|| 14–10
|- align="center" bgcolor="bbffbb"
| 25 || April 27 || @ Brewers || 3–2 || Lindstrom (1–0) || McClung  (1–1) || Gregg  (4) || 41,656 || 15–10
|- align="center" bgcolor="ffbbbb"
| 26 || April 29 || Dodgers || 7–6 || Beimel (2–0) || Gregg (3–1) || Saito (3) || 11,334 || 15–11
|- align="center" bgcolor="ffbbbb"
| 27 || April 30 || Dodgers || 13–1 || Billingsley (1–4) || Olsen (3–1) || || 10,792 || 15–12
|-

|- align="center" bgcolor="ffbbbb"
| 28 || May 1 || Dodgers || 5–3 || Beimel (3–0) || Gregg (3–2) || Saito (4) || 15,556 || 15–13
|- align="center" bgcolor="bbffbb"
| 29 || May 2 || Padres || 6–4 || Hendrickson (5–1) || Germano (0–3) || Gregg (5) || 14,562 || 16–13
|- align="center" bgcolor="ffbbbb"
| 30 || May 3 || Padres || 7–2 || Peavy (4–1) || Nolasco (1–3) || || 37,689 || 16–14
|- align="center" bgcolor="bbffbb"
| 31 || May 4 || Padres || 10–3 || A. Miller (2–2) || Maddux (2–3) || || 11,422 || 17–14
|- align="center" bgcolor="bbffbb"
| 32 || May 6 || Brewers || 3–0 || Olsen (3–0) || Suppan (1–2)|| Gregg (6) || 10,113 || 18–14
|- align="center" bgcolor="bbffbb"
| 33 || May 7 || Brewers || 6–2 || Badenhop (1–2) || Bush (0–4)|| || 10,405 || 19–14
|- align="center" bgcolor="bbffbb"
| 34 || May 8 || Brewers || 7–2 || Kensing (1–0) || Villanueva (1–4)|| || 12,321 || 20–14
|- align="center" bgcolor="bbffbb"
| 35 || May 9 || @ Nationals || 7–3 || Nolasco (2–3) || Redding (4–3)|| || 23,379 || 21–14
|- align="center" bgcolor="bbffbb"
| 36 || May 10 || @ Nationals || 11–0 || A. Miller (3–2) || O'Connor (1–1) || || 28,663 || 22–14
|- align="center" bgcolor="bbffbb"
| 37 || May 11 || @ Nationals || 5–4 || Kensing (2–0) || Ayala (1–3) || Gregg (7) || 25,871 || 23–14
|- align="center" bgcolor="ffbbbb"
| 38 || May 12 || @ Reds || 8–7 || Harang (2–5)|| Tankersley (0–1) ||  Cordero (6)|| 15,233 || 23–15
|- align="center" bgcolor="ffbbbb"
| 39 || May 13 || @ Reds || 5–3 || Vólquez (6–1) || Hendrickson (5–2) || Cordero (7) || 14,015 || 23–16
|- align="center" bgcolor="ffbbbb"
| 40 || May 14 || @ Reds || 7–6 || Burton (2–1) || Pinto (1–2) || || 12,756 || 23–17
|- align="center" bgcolor="bbbbbb"
| – || May 15 || @ Reds || colspan=6|Postponed (rain) Rescheduled September 22
|- align="center" bgcolor="ffbbbb"
| 41 || May 16 || Royals || 7–6 || Tomko (2–4) || A. Miller (3–3) || Soria (11) || 14,825 || 23–18
|- align="center" bgcolor="bbffbb"
| 42 || May 17 || Royals || 7–3 || Kensing (3–0) || Bannister (4–5) || || 16,214 || 24–18
|- align="center" bgcolor="ffbbbb"
| 43 || May 18 || Royals || 9–3 || Greinke (5–1) || Badenhop (1–3) || || 10,617 || 24–19
|- align="center" bgcolor="bbffbb"
| 44 || May 20 || Diamondbacks || 3–2 || Hendrickson (6–2) || Owings (5–2) || Gregg (8) || 10,696 || 25–19
|- align="center" bgcolor="bbffbb"
| 45 || May 21 || Diamondbacks || 3–1 || Nolasco (3–3) || Webb (9–1) || Gregg (9) || 11,227 || 26–19
|- align="center" bgcolor="bbffbb"
| 46 || May 22 || Diamondbacks || 4–0 || A. Miller (4–3) || Haren (5–3) ||  || 13,233 || 27–19
|- align="center" bgcolor="ffbbbb"
| 47 || May 23 || Giants || 8–2 || Zito (1–8) || Olsen (4–2) || || 15,003 || 27–20
|- align="center" bgcolor="bbbbbb"
| – || May 24 || Giants || colspan=6|Postponed (rain) Rescheduled May 25, (doubleheader)
|- align="center" bgcolor="bbffbb"
| 48 || May 25 || Giants || 8–6 || Hendrickson (7–2) || Misch (0–1)|| Gregg (10) || 14,674 || 28–20
|- align="center" bgcolor="bbffbb"
| 49 || May 25 || Giants || 5–4 || Gregg (4–2) || Walker  (2–3) || || 14,674 || 29–20
|- align="center" bgcolor="bbffbb"
| 50 || May 26 || @ Mets || 7–3 || Nolasco (4–3) || Pelfrey (2–6) || || 51,489 || 30–20
|- align="center" bgcolor="ffbbbb"
| 51 || May 27 || @ Mets || 5–3 || Santana (6–3) || A. Miller (4–4) || || 47,093 || 30–21
|- align="center" bgcolor="ffbbbb"
| 52 || May 28 || @ Mets || 7–6 || Sánchez (1–0) || J. Miller (1–2) || || 47,769 || 30–22
|- align="center" bgcolor="ffbbbb"
| 53 || May 30 || @ Phillies || 12–3|| Myers (3–6) || Hendrickson (7–3) || || 45,118 || 30–23
|- align="center" bgcolor="bbffbb"
| 54 || May 31 || @ Phillies || 7–3 || Nolasco (5–3) || Hamels (5–4) || || 45,261 || 31–23
|-

|- align="center" bgcolor="ffbbbb"
| 55 || June 1 || @ Phillies || 7–5 || Moyer (6–3) || Waechter (0–1) || Lidge (13) || 45,312 || 31–24
|- align="center" bgcolor="ffbbbb"
| 56 || June 2 || @ Braves || 7 – 5 (10) || Ohman (2–0) || Kensing (3–1) || || 20,896 || 31–25
|- align="center" bgcolor="ffbbbb"
| 57 || June 3 || @ Braves || 5–4 || Ohman (3–0) || Lindstrom (1–0) || Soriano (2) || 25,476 || 31–26
|- align="center" bgcolor="bbffbb"
| 58 || June 4 || @ Braves || 6–4 || J. Miller (2–2) || Acosta (3–3)||Gregg (11) || 26,917 || 32–26
|- align="center" bgcolor="ffbbbb"
| 59 || June 5 || @ Braves || 7–5 || Jurrjens (6–3) || Nolasco (5–4) || Soriano (3) || 27,238 || 32–27
|- align="center" bgcolor="ffbbbb"
| 60 || June 6 || Reds || 11–3 || Cueto (5–5) || A. Miller (4–5) || || 16,084 || 32–28
|- align="center" bgcolor="bbffbb"
| 61 || June 7 || Reds || 8–7 || Badenhop (2–3) || Cordero (2–1) || || 25,289 || 33–28
|- align="center" bgcolor="bbffbb"
| 62 || June 8 || Reds || 9–2 || Tucker (1–0) || Harang (2–9) || || 12,444 || 34–28
|- align="center" bgcolor="ffbbbb"
| 63 || June 9 || Reds || 9–4 || Vólquez (9–2) || Hendrickson (7–4) || || 16,003 || 34–29
|- align="center" bgcolor="bbffbb"
| 64 || June 10 || Phillies || 5–4 || Nolasco (6–4) || Myers (3–8) ||Gregg (12) || 12,411 || 35–29
|- align="center" bgcolor="bbffbb"
| 65 || June 11 || Phillies || 6–2 ||Gregg (5–2) || Gordon (5–3) || || 14,122 || 36–29
|- align="center" bgcolor="ffbbbb"
| 66 || June 12 || Phillies || 3–0 || Moyer (7–3) || Olsen (4–3) || Lidge (18) || 15,202 || 36–30
|- align="center" bgcolor="ffbbbb"
| 67 || June 13 || @ Rays || 7–3 || Sonnanstine (7–3) || Tucker (1–1) || || 19,312 || 36–31
|- align="center" bgcolor="ffbbbb"
| 68 || June 14 || @ Rays || 4–1 || Garza (5–3) || Hendrickson (7–4) || Percival (15) || 31,195 || 36–32
|- align="center" bgcolor="bbffbb"
| 69 || June 15 || @ Rays || 9–3 || Nolasco (7–4) || Jackson (4–6) || || 28,886 || 37–32
|- align="center" bgcolor="bbffbb"
| 70 || June 16 || @ Mariners || 6–1 || A. Miller (5–5) || Silva (3–8) || || 21,609 || 38–32
|- align="center" bgcolor="ffbbbb"
| 71 || June 17 || @ Mariners || 5–4 || Hernández (6–5) || Olsen (4–4) || Morrow (2) || 20,214 || 38–33
|- align="center" bgcolor="bbffbb"
| 72 || June 18 || @ Mariners || 8–3 || Tucker (2–1) || Dickey (1–3) || || 24,163 || 39–33
|- align="center" bgcolor="ffbbbb"
| 73 || June 20 || @ Athletics || 7–6 || Brown (1–0) || Waechter (0–2) || || 15,035 || 39–34
|- align="center" bgcolor="bbffbb"
| 74 || June 21 || @ Athletics || 6–4 || Pinto (2–2) || Street (1–2) ||Gregg (13) || 19,287 || 40–34
|- align="center" bgcolor="ffbbbb"
| 75 || June 22 || @ Athletics || 7–1 || Duchscherer (8–4) || A. Miller (5–6) || || 22,461 || 40–35
|- align="center" bgcolor="ffbbbb"
| 76 || June 24 || Rays || 6–4 || Howell (6–0) || Pinto (2–3) || Percival (18) || 12,352 || 40–36
|- align="center" bgcolor="ffbbbb"
| 77 || June 25 || Rays || 15–3 || Shields (5–5) || Tucker (2–2) || || 13,165 || 40–37
|- align="center" bgcolor="ffbbbb"
| 78 || June 26 || Rays || 6–1 || Garza (6–4) || Hendrickson (7–6) || || 17,107 ||  40–38
|- align="center" bgcolor="bbffbb"
| 79 || June 27 || Diamondbacks || 3–1 || Nolasco (8–4) || Owings (6–7) || Gregg (14) || 15,291 || 41–38
|- align="center" bgcolor="ffbbbb"
| 80 || June 28 || Diamondbacks || 6–2 || Webb (12–4) || A. Miller (5–7) || || 27,777 || 41–39
|- align="center" bgcolor="bbffbb"
| 81 || June 29 || Diamondbacks || 4–3 || Nelson (1–0) || Lyon (2–2) || || 11,327 || 42–39
|- align="center" bgcolor="bbffbb"
| 82 || June 30 || Nationals ||6–5 || Gregg (6–2) || Rauch (4–2) || || 10,888 || 43–39
|-

|- align="center" bgcolor="ffbbbb"
| 83 || July 1 || Nationals  ||9–6 || Balester (1–0) ||Hendrickson (7–7) || ||12,166 ||43–40
|- align="center" bgcolor="bbffbb"
| 84 || July 2 || Nationals ||4–2 ||Nolasco (9–4) ||Manning (0–2) || ||23,624 ||44–40
|- align="center" bgcolor="ffbbbb"
| 85 || July 3 || @ Rockies ||6 – 5 (11) ||Herges (3–3) ||Gregg (6–3) || || 48,084||44–41
|- align="center" bgcolor="ffbbbb"
| 86 || July 4 || @ Rockies ||18–17 ||Buchholz (3–2) ||Gregg (6–4) || ||48,691 || 44–42
|- align="center" bgcolor="ffbbbb"
| 87 || July 5 || @ Rockies || 12–6 || de la Rosa (3–4) || Tucker (2–3) || || 35,137 || 44–43
|- align="center" bgcolor="bbffbb"
| 88 || July 6 || @ Rockies || 10–5 || Volstad (1–0) || Cook (11–6) || || 27,168 || 45–43
|- align="center" bgcolor="bbffbb"
| 89 || July 7 || @ Padres || 3–1 ||Nolasco (10–4) || Maddux (3–7) || Gregg (16) || 23,840 || 46–43
|- align="center" bgcolor="ffbbbb"
| 90 || July 8 || @ Padres || 10–1 || Wolf (6–8) || A. Miller (5–8) || || 24,762 || 46–44
|- align="center" bgcolor="bbffbb"
| 91 || July 9 || @ Padres || 5–2 || Olsen (5–4) || Baek (2–5) || Gregg (17) || 31,186 || 47–44
|- align="center" bgcolor="bbffbb"
| 92 || July 10 || @ Dodgers || 5 – 4 (11) || Nelson (2–0) || Falkenborg (1–2) || Gregg (18) || 40,417 || 48–44
|- align="center" bgcolor="bbffbb"
| 93 || July 11 || @ Dodgers || 3–1 || Volstad (2–0) || Stults (2–2) || Gregg (19) || 49,545 || 49–44
|- align="center" bgcolor="bbffbb"
| 94 || July 12 || @ Dodgers || 5–3 || Waechter (1–2) || Troncoso (0–1) || Gregg (20) || 55,220 || 50–44
|- align="center" bgcolor="ffbbbb"
| 95 || July 13 || @ Dodgers || 9–1 || Billingsley (9–8) || A. Miller (5–9)  || || 42,213 || 50–45
|- align="center" bgcolor="ffbbbb"
| 96 || July 18 || Phillies || 4–2 || Moyer (9–6) ||Nolasco (10–5) || Lidge (21) || 23,124 || 50–46
|- align="center" bgcolor="bbffbb"
| 97 || July 19 || Phillies || 9–5 || Olsen (6–4) || Kendrick (8–4) || || 26,520 || 51–46
|- align="center" bgcolor="bbffbb"
| 98 || July 20 || Phillies || 3 – 2 (11) || Waechter (2–2) || Condrey (2–2) || || 17,724 || 52–46
|- align="center" bgcolor="ffbbbb"
| 99 || July 21 || Braves || 4–0 || Campillo (5–4) || Volstad (2–1) || || 14,155 || 52–47
|- align="center" bgcolor="bbffbb"
| 100 || July 22 || Braves || 4–0 || Vandenhurk (1–1) || Morton (2–3) || || 14,721 || 53–47
|- align="center" bgcolor="ffbbbb"
| 101 || July 23 || Braves || 9–4 || Hudson (11–7) || Nolasco (10–6) || || 16,068 || 53–48
|- align="center" bgcolor="ffbbbb"
| 102 || July 24 || @ Cubs || 6–3  || Zambrano (11–4) || Olsen (6–5) || Mármol (4) || 41,482 || 53–49
|- align="center" bgcolor="bbffbb"
| 103 || July 25 || @ Cubs || 3–2 || J. Miller (3–2) || Howry (3–4) || Gregg (21) || 41,570 || 54–49
|- align="center" bgcolor="bbffbb"
| 104 || July 26 || @ Cubs || 3 – 2 (12) || J. Miller (4–2) || Gaudin (5–4) || Gregg (22) || 41,471 || 55–49
|- align="center" bgcolor="ffbbbb"
| 105 || July 27 || @ Cubs || 9–6 || Gaudin (6–4) || Hendrickson (7–8) || Samardzija (1) || 41,017 || 55–50
|- align="center" bgcolor="bbffbb"
| 106 || July 28 || Mets || 7–3 || Waechter (3–2) || Smith (1–3) || || 23,165 || 56–50
|- align="center" bgcolor="ffbbbb"
| 107 || July 29 || Mets || 4–1 || Pérez (7–6) || Olsen (6–6) || Wagner (27) || 25,032 || 56–51
|- align="center" bgcolor="bbffbb"
| 108 || July 30 || Mets || 7–5 || Johnson (1–0) || Pelfrey (9–7) || Gregg (23) || 25,902 || 57–51
|- align="center" bgcolor="bbffbb"
| 109 || July 31 || Rockies || 12–2 || A. Sánchez (1–0) || de la Rosa (5–6) || || 13,634 || 58–51
|-

|- align="center" bgcolor="ffbbbb"
| 110 || August 1 || Rockies || 5–2 || Jiménez (8–9) || Volstad (2–2) || Fuentes (19) || 16,555 || 58–52
|- align="center" bgcolor="bbffbb"
| 111 || August 2 || Rockies || 5–3 || Nolasco (11–6) || de los Santos (0–1) || Gregg (24) || 22,324 || 59–52
|- align="center" bgcolor="ffbbbb"
| 112 || August 3 || Rockies || 3–2 || Buchholz (4–3) || Nelson (2–1) || Fuentes (20) || 14,310 || 59–53
|- align="center" bgcolor="bbffbb"
| 113 || August 5 || @ Phillies || 8–2 || Johnson (2–0) || Moyer (10–7) || || 44,896  || 60–53
|- align="center" bgcolor="ffbbbb"
| 114 || August 6 || @ Phillies || 5–0 || Kendrick (10–5) || A. Sánchez (1–1) || || 45,078 || 60–54
|- align="center" bgcolor="bbffbb"
| 115 || August 7 || @ Phillies || 3–0 || Volstad (3–2) || Hamels (9–8) || Gregg (25) || 45,521 || 61–54
|- align="center" bgcolor="ffbbbb"
| 116 || August 8 || @ Mets || 3–0 || Pérez (8–7) || Nolasco (11–7) || Heilman (1) || 50,307 || 61–55
|- align="center" bgcolor="ffbbbb"
| 117 || August 9 || @ Mets || 8–6 || Schoeneweis (2–2) || Olsen (6–7) || Heilman (2) || 52,484 || 61–56
|- align="center" bgcolor="bbffbb"
| 118 || August 10 || @ Mets || 8–2 || Johnson (3–0) || Pelfrey (10–8) || || 54,242 || 62–56
|- align="center" bgcolor="ffbbbb"
| 119 || August 11 || Cardinals || 4–2 || Piñeiro (5–5) || A. Sánchez (1–2) || Pérez (2) || 13,419 || 62–57
|- align="center" bgcolor="bbffbb"
| 120 || August 12 || Cardinals || 4–3 || Volstad (4–2) || Lohse (13–5) || Gregg (26) || 14,211 || 63–57
|- align="center" bgcolor="ffbbbb"
| 121 || August 13 || Cardinals || 6–4 || Looper (11–9) || Pinto (2–4) || Pérez (3) || 15,223 || 63–58
|- align="center" bgcolor="ffbbbb"
| 122 || August 14 || Cardinals || 3–0 || Wellemeyer (10–4) || Olsen (6–8) || || 15,609 || 63–59
|- align="center" bgcolor="ffbbbb"
| 123 || August 15 || Cubs || 6–5 || Gaudin (6–4) || Gregg (6–5)  || Kerry Wood (25) || 28,163 || 63–60
|- align="center" bgcolor="bbffbb"
| 124 || August 16 || Cubs || 2 -1 || A. Sánchez (2–2) || Marshall (2–3) || Gregg (27) || 39,124 || 64–60
|- align="center" bgcolor="ffbbbb"
| 125 || August 17 || Cubs || 9–2 || Dempster (14–5) || Pinto (2–5) || || 19,085 || 64–61
|- align="center" bgcolor="bbffbb"
| 126 || August 19 || @ Giants || 6–0 || Nolasco (12–7) || Correia (2–7) || || 33,098 || 65–61
|- align="center" bgcolor="ffbbbb"
| 127 || August 20 || @ Giants || 6–5 || Wilson (1–2) || Lindstrom (1–2) || || 30,399 || 65–62
|- align="center" bgcolor="ffbbbb"
| 128 || August 21 || @ Giants || 4–3 || Wilson (2–2) || Gregg (6–6) || || 32,515 || 65–63
|- align="center" bgcolor="bbffbb"
| 129 || August 22 || @ Diamondbacks || 5–4 || Rhodes (3–1) || Rauch (4–4) || Gregg (28) || 28,201 || 66–63
|- align="center" bgcolor="ffbbbb"
| 130 || August 23 || @ Diamondbacks || 7–1 || Petit (3–3) || Volstad (4–3) || || 44,294 || 66–64
|- align="center" bgcolor="bbffbb" 
| 131 || August 24 || @ Diamondbacks || 5–2 || Nolasco (13–7) || Davis (5–8) || Gregg (29) || 31,518 || 67–64
|- align="center" bgcolor="ffbbbb"
| 132 || August 26 || @ Braves || 10–9 || Ohman (4–0) || Gregg (6–7) || || 17,539 || 67–65
|- align="center" bgcolor="bbffbb"
| 133 || August 27 || @ Braves || 4–1 || Johnson (4–0) || Hampton (2–2) || || 19,755 || 68–65
|- align="center" bgcolor="ffbbbb"
| 134 || August 28 || @ Braves || 4–2 || Morton (4–8) || A. Sánchez (2–2) || González (7) || 20,155 || 68–66
|- align="center" bgcolor="ffbbbb"
| 135 || August 29 || Mets || 5–4 || Smith (2–3) || Gregg (6–8) || Ayala (3) || 20,043 || 68–67
|- align="center" bgcolor="bbffbb"
| 136 || August 30 || Mets  || 4–3 || Lindstrom (2–2) || Heilman (3–8) || || 28,830 || 69–67
|- align="center" bgcolor="ffbbbb"
| 137 || August 31 || Mets || 6–2 || Martínez (5–3) || Olsen (6–9) || || 16,123 || 69–68
|-

|- align="center" bgcolor="bbffbb"
| 138 || September 1 || Braves || 4–3 || Lindstrom (3–2) || González (0–1) || || 12,209 || 70–68
|- align="center" bgcolor="ffbbbb"
| 139 || September 2 || Braves || 16–14 || Julio (1–0) || Lindstrom (3–3) || González (8)  || 14,092 || 70–69
|- align="center" bgcolor="bbffbb"
| 140 || September 3 || Braves || 5–3 || Waechter (4–2) || Ohman (4–1) || Nelson (1) || 11,211 || 71–69
|- align="center" bgcolor="bbffbb"
| 141 || September 5 || @ Cardinals || 4 – 1  (11) || Rhodes (4–1) || Franklin (5–6) || Lindstrom (1) || 42,633 || 72–69
|- align="center" bgcolor="ffbbbb"
| 142 || September 6 || @ Cardinals || 5–3 || Wellemeyer (12–6) || Olsen (6–10) || Franklin (15) || 42,814 || 72–70
|- align="center" bgcolor="ffbbbb"
| 143 || September 7 || @ Cardinals || 3–1 || Wainwright (9–3) || Johnson (4–1) || Pérez (7) || 46,045 || 72–71
|- align="center" bgcolor="ffbbbb"
| 144 || September 8 || @ Phillies || 8–6 || Blanton (7–12) || A. Sánchez (2–4) || Lidge (35) || 38,921 || 72–72
|- align="center" bgcolor="bbffbb"
| 145 || September 9 || @ Phillies || 10–8 || Gregg (7–8)  || Kendrick (11–9) || Lindstrom (2) || 40,554 || 73–72
|- align="center" bgcolor="bbffbb"
| 146 || September 10 || @ Phillies || 7–3 || Nolasco (14–7) || Myers (9–11) || || 38,665 || 74–72
|- align="center" bgcolor="bbffbb"
| 147 || September 12 || Nationals || 2–1 || Olsen (7–10) || Martis (0–2) || Lindstrom (3) || 12,121 || 75–72
|- align="center" bgcolor="bbffbb"
| 148 || September 13 || Nationals || 4–2 || Johnson (5–1) || Redding (10–9) || Lindstrom (4) || 16,307 || 76–72
|- align="center" bgcolor="bbffbb"
| 149 || September 14 || Nationals || 8–7 || A. Miller (6–9) || Shell (2–2) || Rhodes (2) || 12,024 || 77–72
|- align="center" bgcolor="bbffbb"
| 150 || September 16 || Astros || 5–1 || Volstad (5–3) || Oswalt (15–10) || || 12,232 || 78–72
|- align="center" bgcolor="bbffbb"
| 151 || September 17 || Astros || 14–2 || Nolasco (15–7) || Backe (9–13) || || 14,124 || 79–72
|- align="center" bgcolor="bbffbb"
| 152 || September 18 || Astros || 8–1 || Olson (8–10) || Árias (1–1) || || 14,219 || 80–72
|- align="center" bgcolor="bbffbb"
| 153 || September 19 || Phillies || 14–8 || Johnson (6–1) || Myers (10–12) || || 20,202 || 81–72
|- align="center" bgcolor="ffbbbb"
| 154 || September 20 || Phillies || 3–2 || Blanton (3–0) || A. Sánchez (2–5) || Lidge (39) || 28,757 || 81–73
|- align="center" bgcolor="ffbbbb"
| 155 || September 21 || Phillies || 5–2 || Moyer (15–7) || Volstad (5–4) || Lidge (40) || 28,173 || 81–74
|- align="center" bgcolor="ffbbbb"
| 156 || September 22 || @ Reds || 7–5 || Harang (6–16) || A. Miller (6–10) || Cordero (33) || 13,565 || 81–75
|- align="center" bgcolor="ffbbbb"
| 157 || September 23 || @ Nationals || 9–4 || Martis (1–3) || Olsen (8–11) || || 20,657 || 81–76
|- align="center" bgcolor="bbffbb"
| 158 || September 24 || @ Nationals || 9–4 || Johnson (7–1) || Redding (10–11) || || 23,299 || 82–76
|- align="center" bgcolor="bbbbbb"
| – || September 25 || @ Nationals || colspan=6|Cancelled (rain) No make-up game was scheduled
|- align="center" bgcolor="bbffbb"
| 159 || September 26 || @ Mets || 6–1 || Volstad (6–4) || Pelfrey (13–11) || || 49,545 || 83–76
|- align="center" bgcolor="ffbbbb"
| 160 || September 27 || @ Mets || 2–0 || Santana (16–7) || Nolasco (15–8) || || 54,920 || 83–77
|- align="center" bgcolor="bbffbb"
| 161 || September 28 || @ Mets || 4–2 || Nelson (3–1) || Schoeneweis (2–6) || Lindstrom (5) || 56,059 || 84–77
|-

Player stats

Batting
Note: G = Games played; AB = At bats; R = Runs scored; H = Hits; 2B = Doubles; 3B = Triples; HR = Home runs; RBI = Runs batted in; AVG = Batting average; SB = Stolen bases

Pitching
Note: W = Wins; L = Losses; ERA = Earned run average; G = Games pitched; GS = Games started; SV = Saves; IP = Innings pitched; R = Runs allowed; ER = Earned runs allowed; BB = Walks allowed; K = Strikeouts

Draft

Players selected

Farm system

References

External links
2008 Florida Marlins season at Baseball Reference

Miami Marlins seasons
Florida Marlins season
Miami